A Storm of Love (transliterated A'sefa min al-hubb) is an Egyptian film released in 1961. The film is directed and written by Hussein el-Mohandess and stars Salah Zulfikar and Nahed Sherif.

Synopsis
A rivalry develops between the Ubaida and Rizeiga tribes: an Ubaida mother asks her son Hamed to burn Rizeiga crops once the killer of a Rizeiga is released from prison. Hamed is considered one of the most eligible bachelors in the village, and while his mother wants him to pick a glamorous village woman, he is struck by a dancing gypsy girl named Khaleda and determined to seduce her. Opposed by her patron Sharif and his family, Hamed elopes with Khaleda to the coastal region of El Manzala, where they eke out a modest living on his fishing wages and their whereabouts are known to none back home except the trusted Sheikh Mabrouk. Sharif, however, arrives at their bungalow to retrieve his meal ticket, convincing her to leave Hamed.

Hamed returns to his home village and marries his mother's choice, Zainab, but Khaleda remains by the sea and decides not to return to Sharif's enslavement. Sheikh Mabrouk shelters her and sends for Hamed when she suffers health complications after giving birth to a son, which ultimately kill her. Hamed returns to the village and Zainab promises to raise the child with him as their own.

Crew
 Director: Hussein el-Mohandess
 Studio: United Film Company, produced by Abdel Aziz Fahmy and partners
 Distributor: United Cinema, run by Sobhi Farhat
 Cinematographer: Abdel Aziz Fahmy
 Music: Fouad el-Zahery

Cast

Main cast
 Salah Zulfikar (Hamed)
 Nahed Sherif (Khaleda)
 Amina Rizk (Hamed's mother)
 Adly Kasseb (Sharif)
 Widad Hamdi (Khaleda's friend)
 Nadia Al-Gindi (Zainab)
 Muhammad Othman (Zainab's father)
 Mohsen Hassanein (Rizeiga chief)
 Ibrahim Emara (Sheikh Mabrouk)

Supporting cast
 Lotfi Abdel Hamid
 Mohamed Hamdi
 Mohamed Maghraby
 Abdul Hamid Badawi
 Mahmoud al-Arabi
 Fawzi Darwish

External links
 El Cinema page
 IMDb page

References

Egyptian black-and-white films
1961 films